Senator Byrnes may refer to:

James F. Byrnes (1882–1972), South Carolina State Senate
John W. Byrnes (1913–1985), Wisconsin State Senate
Jo Byrns (1869–1936), Tennessee State Senate
Samuel Byrns (1848–1914), Missouri State Senate

See also
Senator Burns (disambiguation)
Senator Byrne (disambiguation)